is a private women's junior college in Iida, Nagano, Japan, established in 1967.

External links
 Official website 

Japanese junior colleges
Educational institutions established in 1967
Private universities and colleges in Japan
Universities and colleges in Nagano Prefecture
1967 establishments in Japan
Women's universities and colleges in Japan